Arthur II (25 July 1261 – 27 August 1312), of the House of Dreux, was Duke of Brittany from 1305 to his death. He was the first son of John II and Beatrice, daughter of Henry III of England and Eleanor of Provence.

After he inherited the ducal throne, his brother John became Earl of Richmond.

As duke, Arthur was independent of the French crown. He divided his duchy into eight "battles": Léon, Kernev, Landreger, Penteur, Gwened, Naoned, Roazhon, and Sant Malou. In 1309, he convoked the first Estates of Brittany. It was the first time in French history that the third estate was represented.

Arthur died at Château de l'Isle in Saint Denis en Val and was interred in a marble tomb of the cordeliers of Vannes. The tomb was vandalised during the French Revolution, but later repaired and is on display today.

Marriages and children
In 1275, Arthur married Marie, Viscountess of Limoges, daughter of Guy VI, Viscount of Limoges, and Margaret, Lady of Molinot. Her maternal grandparents were Hugh IV, Duke of Burgundy, and his first wife, Yolande of Dreux. They were parents of three children:

 John III, Duke of Brittany (8 March 1286 – 30 April 1341).
 Guy de Penthièvre, Count of Penthièvre (1287 – 1331); father of Joanna of Penthièvre.
 Peter of Brittany, Seigneur of Dol-Combourg and Sant-Maloù (1289 – 1312).

Marie died in 1291. In May 1292, Arthur married Yolande of Dreux, who was Countess of Montfort, daughter of Robert IV, Count of Dreux, and Beatrice de Montfort. Yolande had briefly been Queen of Scotland by her first marriage. They were parents of six children:

 John of Montfort (1295 – 16 September 1345).
  (1295–1384); married Guy X, Lord of Laval.
 ; married Robert, Count of Marle, Lord of Cassel (son of Robert III, Count of Flanders).
  (1297–1377); married Bouchard VI, Count of Vendôme, a member of the House of Montoire.
 Blanche of Brittany (born ); considered to have died young.
 Marie of Brittany (1302–1371); a nun.

See also
Dukes of Brittany family tree

Footnotes

References 

|-

1261 births
1312 deaths
13th-century Breton people
14th-century dukes of Brittany
Dukes of Brittany
House of Dreux